Norge was an East Indiaman of the Danish Asiatic Company. She was taken as a prize by HMS Sceptre at the Cape of Good Hope in January 1808.

Origins
The ship was a Dutch frigate taken as a prize by British forces. The name was subsequently changed to Tranquebar. In 1797, she was sold to the Danish Asiatic Company. In 1798, she was adapted at Asiatisk Plads and the name was subsequently changed to Norge. Her bilbrev was issued on 19 March 1798.

DAC career
[[File:Christian Carl Tronier - Norge, 1804.png|thumb|Carl Christian Tronier: The Danish Asiatic Company's ship Norge, bound for China (1804)..]]

Captain Carl Schultz sailed from Copenhagen on 24 May 1798, bound for Tranquebar.Norge arived at Tranquebar on 4 February 1799. She arrived back in Copenhagen on 6 October 1799.

Carl Schultz was the nephew of counter admiral Andreas Georg Hermann Schultz. It was his last edpedition as captain for the Danish Asiatic Company. In 1806, he unsuccessfully applied for the position as chief of Frederiknagore.

Captain Nicolay Brinck sailed from Copenhagen on 30 May 1800, bound for Tranquebar. J. A. Ponsing served as master (styrmand) on the expedition. Norge had a complement of 91 men. She arrived back in Copenhagen on 19 October 1802. 

H. G. Trock sailed from Copenhagen on 23 April 1804, bound for Canton. She arrived back in Copenhagen on 5 March 1806.

Fate
She sailed from Copenhagen in 1807. On 31 January 1808, she was taken as a prize by HMS Sceptre.

Further reading
 Lehmann: Østen'', p.160)

References

External links

Ships of the Danish Asiatic Company
Frigates of Denmark
Captured ships